Galkin (masculine) or Galkina (feminine) is a Russian surname. It is derived from Galka (jackdaw) Notable people with the surname include:

 Aleksey Galkin, Russian GRU officer
 Aleksandr Galkin (1948–2018), Russian football coach and former football player
 Aleksandr Galkin (born 1979), Russian chess grandmaster
 Evgeni Galkin (born 1975), Russian professional ice hockey winger
 Maxim Galkin (born 1976), Russian comedian, singer, and TV host
 Pavel Galkin (born 1968), Russian sprinter
 Pavel Andreyevich Galkin (1922–2021), Soviet military pilot, Hero of the Soviet Union
 Vladislav Galkin (1971–2010), Russian actor

Galkina
 Gulnara Samitova-Galkina (born 1978), Russian middle-distance runner
 Katsiaryna Halkina (born 1997), Belarusian rhythmic gymnast
 Lyubov Galkina (born 1973), Russian sport shooter
 Lyudmila Galkina (born 1972), Russian athlete
 Ekaterina Galkina (born 1988), Russian curler

References 

Russian-language surnames
Matronymic surnames